Elwyn is an unincorporated community located in Middletown Township, Delaware County, Pennsylvania, USA. Elwyn has a latitude of 39.907N, longitude of -75.41W and an elevation of 253 feet above sea level.

Elwyn is home to Elwyn Inc., a facility caring for the needs of the developmentally disabled and disadvantaged.

Elwyn is named for Dr. Alfred L. Elwyn, a physician who founded The Pennsylvania Training School for Feeble-minded Children in 1852 with teacher James B. Richards.

See also
Media Area

References

External links
Elwyn Inc. facility official site

Unincorporated communities in Delaware County, Pennsylvania
Unincorporated communities in Pennsylvania